Login is a 2012 Indian Hindi-language suspense thriller film directed by Sanjeev Reddy. The project is produced by Cocktail Pictures, and stars Himanshu Bhatt, Radhika Roy, Akkash Basnet, Rashmi Gautam, Nandini Rai, Siddarth Chopra, KK Binojee. The soundtrack is composed by Sunil Kashyap along with lyrics by KK Binojee. Login was released on 12 October 2012.

Plot 

Login is a Hindi feature film about three different individuals and how the Internet and social networking sites changed their lives. True to its caption – "Connected online but disconnected in life" – the film portrays how everyone is glued to the Internet and hence getting away from their true selves.

Jai is a young office worker who seeks a girlfriend through online dating sites. Vandana is a housewife who spends her free time chatting on social networking sites. Debu is a call centre worker who uses the Net to make money. How the usage of the Internet had affected the lives of these three characters forms the crux of the story.

Cast 
 Himanshu Bhatt as Mrityunjay Viswa karma
 Radhika Roy as Vandana
 Akkash Basnet as Debashish Mondal
 Rashmi Gautam as Vrutika
 Nandini Rai as Divya
 KK Binojee as Vishaal
 Siddharth Chopra as Johnny
 Pavani Reddy as Seema

Soundtrack

Critical reception 
Login was rated 3 stars by The Times of India.

Remakes 
Login was remade into Telugu as Ladies & Gentlemen, which was well received by both the audience and critics. The Times of India gave the Telugu version 3 stars and gave full credit to Reddy for coming up with a convincing storyline.

References

Sources

 Team of Login with Komal Nahta Zetc
 http://www.gomolo.com/log-in-movie/43905
 http://www.bollywoodhungama.com/index/search/q/LOGIN
 http://www.koimoi.com/photos/login-movie-special-screening/
 http://www.bollywoodtrade.com/press-release/cocktail-pictures-login-to-release-on-12th-october-2012/00101430-3ad3-41ce-a79d-72eadfe1546a/
 
 http://entertainment.oneindia.in/bollywood/movies/login/story.html
 http://www.bharatstudent.com/cafebharat/photo_gallery_2-Hindi-Movies-Login-photo-galleries-1,4,4338.php
 http://www.bollywoodmantra.com/album/login-1/
 http://www.bollywoodmantra.com/album/screening-of-the-film-login/
 http://www.desimartini.com/movies/login/md2675.htm
 http://apnaindia.com/entertainment/galleries/bollywood/login-hindi-movie-working-stills-02-10-2012--4534.html
 http://apnaindia.com/entertainment/wallpaper/bollywood/login-hindi-movie-working-wallpapers-02-10-2012--1296.html
 http://movies.sulekha.com/hindi/login/pictures/1.htm
 https://web.archive.org/web/20140907172951/http://www.realbollywood.com/gallery/thumbnails-6009.html
 http://pluzmedia.in/galleries/bollywood/65604/login-movie-stills.htm
 http://pluzmedia.in/galleries/bollywood/65600/login-movie-working-stills.htm
 http://pluzmedia.in/galleries/tollywood/66421/login-telugu-movie-photos.htm
 http://www.glamsham.com/movie/login/1918/
 http://www.cinejosh.com/bolly-wood-photos/9318/7/login-movie-stills.html

External links
 
 
 
 

2012 films
2010s Hindi-language films
Films about adultery in India
Films shot in Mumbai
Films about organised crime in India
Hindi films remade in other languages
2012 directorial debut films
Films about the Internet
Films about social media